Zhang Li (born 1953), is a Chinese billionaire who is a co-founder of Guangzhou R&F Properties. He is president of Fuli Group. In Hurun Report's 2013 China Rich List he was the 57th richest person in China with a net-worth of around $2.850 billion.

Biography
Zhang was born in Guangzhou, Guangdong, China in 1953.

Zhang at beginning was an industrial worker in a textile factory which he joined in 1973, later became an official serving in the local government.  

In 1986, he became the chief manager of the Garden Village Hotel. Two years later, he first entered the constructional industry, then developed his own business in the field of real estate. He has a long cooperation with the Hong Kong-based businessman LI Silian.

In 2002, Zhang first invested in Beijing, with 3.2 billion Chinese Yuan. He mainly invested in real estate in Beijing, to fit the demands of the Beijing 2008 Olympic Games.

In Hurun Report 2004 China Rich List, Zhang was ranked among top 100 with a wealth of 1.5 billion Chinese Yuan.  In 2005's Hurun China Rich List, Zhang was ranked No.43 with 2.8 billion Chinese Yuan. In 2007's Forbes Mainland China Rich List, Zhang was ranked No.4 with $4.075 billion.

References

1953 births
Living people
Billionaires from Guangdong
Chinese real estate businesspeople
Businesspeople from Guangzhou
Chinese company founders